is a 2005 film directed by Japanese director Shunichi Nagasaki, partly a remake and partly a sequel to his 1982 film of the same name.

The film has three threads running through it, and also includes footage from the 1982 original throughout:

 One is the story of a couple who are on the run after killing their baby.  This is a largely a remake of the original 1982 film.
 Another thread shows the present-day couple from the original film as they meet again many years after the original events.
 The third thread is supposedly documentary footage of the making of the remake, showing in particular the feelings of the original actors about the characters they played in 1982.

Cast members include: Noriko Eguchi (Yuki), Shoichi Honda (Toru), Kaori Mizushima (Ritsuko), Shigeru Muroi (Inako), Takashi Naitō (Ringo) and Taro Suwa (Shimamoto).

External links
 

2005 films
Films directed by Shunichi Nagasaki
2000s Japanese films